St Dominic's Chishawasha is a Roman Catholic girls boarding school situated in Chishawasha valley, about 24 km from Harare, the capital of Zimbabwe. It began as an elementary school in 1898; the secondary school was opened in 1967. In 2017 the enrollment consisted of 420 full-time boarding students.

History

St Dominic's was founded by the Sisters of the Dominican Order in 1896, and is still run by them. Besides traditional school subjects, sewing, cooking, technology, and business courses are taught. Since 2001 the school has offered A-levels. In 2013, 89 girls from the school took O-levels and 93.26% of these passed, which ranked ninth in the country.

The school was established as a sister school to St Ignatius College which is run by Jesuit priests. Together they produced a music album in 2017. The school is in the Chishawasha Mission parish of St. Ignatius Loyola.

The school motto is 'Veritas', which is a Latin term for truth, and is the motto of the Dominican Sisters. The school badge has a black and white crest which has the cross and the school motto Veritas on the top.

Activities 
Student clubs include taekwondo, karate, chess, drummies, mbira, traditional dance, LEO, drama, art, cheerleaders, and rosary group. Sports include basketball, volleyball, athletics, and soccer.

In 2016 the girls won first place among 17 schools in a choral competition.

Notable alumni
Petina Gappah, author
Betty Makoni, gender activist
Priscilla Misihairambwi-Mushonga, politician
Zukiswa Wanner, author
Divine Ndhlukula, Business woman

See also
List of schools in Zimbabwe
List of boarding schools

References

High schools in Zimbabwe
Girls' schools in Zimbabwe
Girls' high schools in Zimbabwe
Boarding schools in Zimbabwe
Private schools in Zimbabwe
Catholic schools in Zimbabwe
Catholic secondary schools in Zimbabwe
Dominican schools in Zimbabwe
Buildings and structures in Harare Province
Educational institutions established in 1896
1896 establishments in the British Empire